Ciborium may refer to:

Ciborium (container), normally a covered cup for holding hosts from the Christian eucharist, or a shape of Ancient Greek cup
Ciborium (architecture), normally a canopy-like structure built over the altar of a Christian church